The Baroness is the fourth studio album by Canadian singer-songwriter and pianist Sarah Slean, released on March 11, 2008.

Track listing
 "Hopeful Hearts" – 3:32
 "Get Home" – 3:42
 "Euphoria" – 3:13
 "Goodnight Trouble" – 4:38
 "Notes from the Underground" – 4:03
 "Sound of Water / Change Your Mind" – 4:14
 "No Place at All" – 3:58
 "Please Be Good to Me" – 4:04
 "Willow" – 3:31
 "So Many Miles" – 3:35
 "Shadowland" – 4:07
 "Looking for Someone" – 3:51

All songs by Sarah Slean
All strings arranged and conducted by Sarah Slean
All horns arranged by Sarah Slean

Bonus tracks
 "Get Home (Demo)" – Was available for download when signing up for the new official mailing list.
 "Parasol" – Available for download after pre-ordering the album through Sarahslean.com.
 "The Rose" – Available on iTunes and The Baroness Redecorates.
 "Lonely Side of the Moon" – Available on iTunes and The Baroness Redecorates.

External links
Sarah Slean's official website

2008 albums
Sarah Slean albums